Bleschames was a Persian military officer, who first served the Sasanian Empire and from 541 the Byzantine Empire. He is first mentioned in 541 as the head of the Sasanian garrison of the fortress Sisauranon, where he defected to the Byzantine army under Belisarius, who sent him and 800 Sasanian cavalrymen to the Byzantine capital of Constantinople. However, he did not stay there for long, and was sent to Italy in order to fight the Ostrogothic Kingdom in the Gothic War, while some of his men were sent to fight under Artabazes. Nothing else is known of his life.

Sources

References

Year of death unknown
People of the Roman–Sasanian Wars
Year of birth unknown
6th-century Iranian people
People of the Gothic War (535–554)
6th-century Byzantine military personnel
Generals of Khosrow I
Byzantine people of Iranian descent